Benjamin Greene may refer to:

Benjamin Greene (brewer) (1780–1860), founder of the Greene King brewing business
Benjamin Greene (politician) (1764–1837), American state legislator from Maine
Benjamin Buck Greene (1808–1902), English financier and Bank of England governor
Benjamin Franklin Greene (1817–1895), American engineering academic
Ben Greene (1901–1978), British Labour Party activist and pacifist

See also
Benjamin Green (disambiguation)